Ambagan is a village located under Khulshi Thana in Chittagong, Bangladesh.

References 

Populated places in Chittagong Division